The Prix Blumenthal (or Blumenthal Prize) was a grant or stipend awarded through the philanthropy of Florence Meyer Blumenthal (1875–1930) – and the foundation she created, Fondation franco-américaine Florence Blumenthal (Franco-American Florence Blumenthal Foundation) – to discover young French artists, aid them financially, and in the process draw the United States and France closer together through the arts.

Winners were designated by seven juries in the fields of the literature, painting, sculpture, decorative arts, structure, engraving and music – to receive a purse of six thousand francs per year, given for two years.  The purse increased in 1926 until Blumenthal's death in 1930 to ten thousand francs for two years.

Jurors included philosopher Henri Bergson; novelist Roland Dorgelès; novelist, essayist, diplomat and playwright Jean Giraudoux; writer Anna de Noailles; poet and essayist Paul Valéry; painter Paul Signac, painter and printmaker Édouard Vuillard, sculptor Paul Landowski, painter and sculptor Aristide Maillol, architect Auguste Perret, composer Paul Dukas, composer Maurice Ravel and composer/conductor Guy Ropartz.

Composer Georges Migot served as vice-president and subsequently as president (1931–1935)  of the foundation, as well as the archivist of the winners.

Beginning in 1919 the foundation awarded nearly two hundred grants, and on April 11, 1937, the Prix Blumenthal was declared d'utilité publique ("of public service"), giving it a special tax classification.  Awards were given through 1954.  At the time of the foundation's dissolution in 1973 it was under the direction of Georges Huisman, director of the école des Beaux-Arts, along with author André Maurois and novelist Roland Dorgelès.

In 2010 (May 14 – June 5), the Médiathèque of Haguenau hosted an exhibit of the Florence Blumenthal archives.

Florence Meyer Blumenthal

Florence Meyer Blumenthal had married international financier George Blumenthal in 1898  and in 1919, she organized what was originally called the La Fondation américaine Blumenthal pour la pensée et l’art français (American Foundation for French Art and Thought) – a name suggested by her friend, Paul Valéry, the poet and essayist – and what ultimately became Fondation franco-américaine Florence Blumenthal.

Blumethal's younger brother Eugene Meyer Jr. later become the president and publisher of The Washington Post – and was the father of Katharine Graham, editor of The Washington Post during Watergate.  She was also related to Levi Strauss through her sisters.

In 1925, Blumenthal moved to Paris with her husband, later donating large sums to the Children's Hospital in Paris, the Metropolitan Museum of Art in New York and the Sorbonne in Paris. Blumenthal died in Paris in 1930, at age fifty-five, having won, along with her husband, the French Legion of Honor the previous year.

Impact of the Prix
As an example of the impact of the Prix Blumenthal, textile artist Paule Marrot received the stipend in 1928, which allowed Marrot to open her workshop in Batignolles on rue Truffaut – where she became widely known for furniture textiles.  Marrot went on to experience strong popularity and commercial success in the U.S. after World War II, made a strong impact at Renault by pioneering the company's textile and color division, and redefined furnishing fabrics in France. In 1952 Marrot was awarded the French Légion d'honneur (Legion of Honor), (Chevalier) – and her textiles continue under license to diverse companies including  Nike, Anthropologie and the handbag maker, Hayden-Harnett.

Recipients
Partial list, by year of award:

References

 
Humanitarian and service awards
Visual arts awards
Grants (money)
France–United States relations
Awards established in 1919